Life Goes On is the second album by the German DJ Sash! released on 17 August 1998 via Mighty label. It contains the hit singles "La Primavera" and "Mysterious Times". Overall, the record includes four singles: "La Primavera", "Mysterious Times", "Move Mania", and "Colour the World". The album was certified gold in the UK.

Track listing
UK Edition

Charts

Certifications

References

External links
Sash – Life Goes On The Remix Edition (2012)
Official website

1998 albums
Sash! albums